Palaly Military Base is a military base located in Palaly, Northern Province of Sri Lanka, and the largest on the Jaffna Peninsula. The base houses the Security Forces Headquarters - Jaffna and is in close proximity to the naval base SLNS Uttara at Kankasanturai and air base SLAF Palaly. The Sri Lanka Army Medical Corps maintains a base hospital in Palaly, and hosts the 3rd Regiment of the Sri Lanka Signals Corps as well.

References

Sri Lankan Army bases
Military installations in Northern Province, Sri Lanka